Polyporopepsin (Polyporus aspartic proteinase, Irpex lacteus aspartic proteinase, Irpex lacteus carboxyl proteinase B) is an enzyme. This enzyme catalyses the following chemical reaction

 Milk clotting activity, broad specificity, but fails to cleave Leu15-Tyr or Tyr16-Leu of insulin B chain

This enzyme is isolated from the basidiomycete Polyporus tulipiferae.

References

External links 
 

EC 3.4.23